European Speedrunner Assembly (abbreviated to ESA), formerly European Speedster Assembly, is a semi-annual video game speedrunning charity marathon held in Sweden. Held since 2012, the events have raised hundreds of thousands of dollars for several charities.

The two flagship events of the European Speedrunner Assembly are European Speedrunner Assembly Winter, held in February every year, and ESA Summer, held between June and August every year. Both events last seven days. In addition to these events, ESA also hosts smaller European-based speedrunning events such as the Benelux Speedrunner Gathering (BSG), as well as Break the Record: Live, a three-day competition to break the world record of a specified game and category. They also host special charity marathons. By 2016, ESA was the second-largest speedrunning event globally. It has been described as "a kind of European federation for these virtual “athletes”."

Events are broadcast live on Twitch. Viewers are encouraged to donate with incentives and bids, such as choosing character names, having runners perform additional tasks, or extra bonus runs.

Format 
ESA runs two main marathons, ESA Winter and ESA Summer, which raise money for charities such as Alzheimerfonden. Speedrunners present runs where they try to beat their chosen games and categories within an estimated time, which is broadcast live on Twitch and in front of a studio audience. Many of the runs feature bonus incentives and additional challenges, such as difficulty upgrades or being performed blindfolded. There are also non-standard speedrun formats, such as relay races.

When donating, donors can choose to put their money towards a particular incentive, such as naming characters.

European Speedrunner Assembly is affiliated with several smaller marathons that use the ESAMarathon Twitch channel, such as Benelux Speedrunner Gathering (BSG) and United Kingdom Speedrunner Gathering (UKSG).

Break the Record: Live 
Break the Record: Live is a sponsored event run by ESA, where the top qualifying players of a particular game and category compete to break the world record live in said category. A prize pool is split amongst the runners depending on their placings during the event, with additional prize money being awarded for breaking the record.

The first event was announced on December 26, 2019, for the Super Mario 64 120 Star category. The seven highest ranked Super Mario 64 speedrunners were flown to Sweden to participate in the live event. The event was sponsored by Elgato Gaming with a $5,000 prize pool, with the first prize being $3,000. An additional $5,000 grand prize was allocated for breaking the record.

In July 2020, the second event, for Doom Eternal, was held during ESA Summer Online 2020, sponsored by the internet security developer Kaspersky Lab.

History 

In August 2012, Swedish gaming organisation Ludendi hosted a streaming marathon called European Speedster Assembly in Skövde, raising money for the charity Hand in Hand. It was inspired by Games Done Quick, a similar charity marathon based in America.

Ludendi also hosted the events in 2013 and 2014. From 2015, ESA has used the Twitch channel europeanspeedsterassembly.

In 2016, ESA changed its name to European Speedrunner Assembly.

In 2018 the organisation officially registered as a company under the name European Speedrunner Assembly AB. The ESA planned to open an amusement arcade in a former industrial site in Växjö in November 2018. This later turned into Smålands Spelhall which officially opened in 2019.

In 2023, ESA reaffirmed its commitment to supporting any and all gender identities.

List of events and marathons

ESA Summer

ESA Winter

Break the Record: Live

Other events

Notes

References

External links 

 Official website

Charity events
Speedrunning
2012 establishments in Sweden
Recurring sporting events established in 2012
Video gaming in Sweden
Video game events